Bon Air, also known as the Adam and Susan Bear House and Bear Lithia, is a historic home located near Elkton, Rockingham County, Virginia. It was built about 1870, and is a two-story, central-passage plan brick dwelling with Italianate and Greek Revival style decorative details.  It has a metal-sheathed, hip-and-deck roof, a rear two story ell, front and back porches, and two one-story bay windows on the front facade.  Also on the property is a contributing two-level meat house/storage building.  The house stands next to Bear Lithia Springs, a boldly flowing water source acquired by the Bear family during the colonial period and commercially exploited in the late-19th and early-20th centuries.

It was listed on the National Register of Historic Places in 2007.

References

Houses on the National Register of Historic Places in Virginia
Greek Revival houses in Virginia
Italianate architecture in Virginia
Houses completed in 1870
Houses in Rockingham County, Virginia
National Register of Historic Places in Rockingham County, Virginia